Cambridge Audio is a British manufacturer of high-end audio equipment. As the name suggests, it has its origins in Cambridge, England, where in the early 1960s a group of young technology graduates established a high-technology R&D and prototyping business: Cambridge Consultants.

Company history

Origins 
Cambridge Audio began life as a division of Cambridge Consultants in 1968. The company's first product was the 2 × 20W P40 integrated amplifier, which was created by a team that included Gordon Edge and Peter Lee. In addition to an advanced technical specification the P40 had a slim case design by Roy Gray, from Woodhuysen Design. 

The P40 would also make history as the first amplifier to use a toroidal transformer, which would go on to be a standard component inside virtually every high-end amplifier produced since.

Cambridge Audio became a standalone business from the group when a new company, Cambridge Audio Laboratories Ltd, was formed, operating from extensive premises alongside the old Enderby's Mill in St. Ives, Cambridge. The P40 was an immediate success, but would prove difficult to manufacture in any volume, a problem that would be resolved in 1970 with the introduction of the new 2 × 25W P50 model, which was a very similar product with regards to both circuit design and appearance, but had been engineered for mass production. Despite strong sales and rapid growth, the company required increased investment and so was sold in 1971 to Colin Hammond of CE Hammond & Co Ltd – then a very successful distributor of Revox tape recorders and other audio products in the UK, Canada and the USA.

A new company, Cambridge Audio Ltd, was formed, with leading UK electrical engineer Stan Curtis joining as the organisation's technical director. The St. Ives factory was extensive and at its peak employed more than 300 people. Most of the required components were made under one roof including the circuit boards and the aluminium cases. All transistors were made to CA's specification and even carried the company's own part numbers. Every product was extensively tested after manufacture and a printed certificate was produced for every individual unit detailing the actual measured performance results.

Changing ownership 

Between the 1980s and 1990s, Cambridge Audio changed owners a few more times, with the business sold to UK hi-fi entrepreneur Vince Adams, in 1980, and relaunched as Cambridge Audio Research Ltd. Financial difficulties for the parent company in 1984 led to Cambridge Audio Research being taken over by Stan and Angie Curtis and renamed Cambridge Audio International.

The next four years saw a rapid expansion of the business with over 16 new products being launched and with export markets re-established in over 28 countries across the world. In 1985 a major innovative step was made with the launch of the CD1, the world's first two-box CD player. The continued expansion of the company put a strain on both its physical and financial resources and at the end of 1988 Cambridge Audio became part of the Hi-Fi Markets Group. 

The product range underwent another significant change in appearance with the low profile black cases giving way to full height cases finished in a neutral grey colour. Internally though, the existing Stan Curtis circuit designs were retained with key new product launches for the DAC2 and DAC3 digital-to-analogue converters and the T40 FM tuner.

Within two years Cambridge Audio was purchased by the Wharfedale company, best known for its loudspeakers, which set up a production line at its large facility in Leeds, Yorkshire.

Wharfedale was undergoing major re-organisation by a team that included Stan Curtis. Despite his sentimental attachment to Cambridge Audio, he realised the company needed a new home that could focus on the electronics and so the decision was made to divest Cambridge Audio and in 1994 the company would be sold for the last time before beginning nearly 30 years of growth and stability.

Audio Partnership 

The purchaser of the business in 1994 was the newly-established Audio Partnership, which was formed by two entrepreneurial businessmen, Julian Richer and James Johnson-Flint, who were already enjoying significant success with home entertainment retailer Richer Sounds. 

Audio Partnership was specifically formed to look for opportunities in acquiring under-developed brands with the intention of providing the investment to allow stability and growth, both in the UK and overseas. Target companies would be ideally British brands that had already developed exceptional technical and design credibility and popularity, but had been lacking in resources or funding to be consistent market leaders in the UK or other markets. Cambridge Audio was considered a perfect fit, becoming the company's first acquisition. 

It remains Audio Partnership's prime focus nearly 30 years later, now solely owned by Johnson-Flint. Johnson-Flint became Chairman of Cambridge Audio in October 2022, with Managing Director Stuart George becoming CEO.

Milestones 

1968, P40 stereo amplifier, world's first to use toroidal transformers
1970, T50 tuner + P50 stereo amplifier
1971, R50 transmission line speakers
1984, C75 pre amplifier + A75 power amplifier
1985, CD1 CD player, world's first two-box CD player
1990, CT50 cassette deck
1994, Acquired by Audio Partnership
1995, DacMagic (original), first Cambridge Audio product to win a What Hi-Fi? Best Buy Award
2003, Azur series
2006, 840 audiophile series
2008, DacMagic
2010, Minx speakers, first to use hybrid BMR technology
2011, NP30, first use of StreamMagic platform
2013, Aero and Aeromax speakers
2013, Minx Air and Minx Go speakers
2015, CX series
2016, Yoyo wireless speakers
2016, Melomania venue opens at Cambridge Audio UK HQ
2018, Edge series, 50th anniversary
2019, Alva TT, world's first Bluetooth AptX HD-enabled turntable
2019, CX series 2 and AX series
2019, Melomania 1, Cambridge Audio's first true wireless earphones
2021, Evo series, Cambridge Audio's first all-in-one streaming amplifier and the first to use Class D amplification
2021, DacMagic 200M, first Cambridge Audio product to support MQA
2021, Melomania 1+ and Melomania Touch earphones, the latter of which are the first to use Class AB amplification
2022, First Red Dot Award wins for Evo and Melomania 1+
2022, Alva TT V2 and Alva ST turntables
2022, James Johnson-Flint becomes Chairman; Stuart George becomes CEO

Source: Cambridge Audio

Partnerships 
Cambridge Audio has worked with several other brands, either to develop products or by hosting events at its Melomania venue space in London.

In 2016, Cambridge Audio partnered with British textile manufacturer Marton Mills to release Yoyo, a new range of three Bluetooth speakers. In the same year, Cambridge Audio opened a venue space, Melomania, below its London HQ. It has since hosted events such as premiere listening sessions for albums including David Bowie’s The Gouster, as well as awards nominations announcements with the Jazz FM Awards and auditions for the Drake YolanDa Award. 

In 2022, Cambridge Audio and DeLorean announced that the new Alpha5 electric vehicle would have a soundsystem designed by Cambridge Audio.

Cambridge Audio is also a Founding Donor of EarthPercent, an eco charity co-founded by Brian Eno to effect change through the music industry.

Manufacturing and the company today 
Audio Partnership set up production facilities in China, with Cambridge Audio products manufactured in the country from 1994.

The company established an office in Hong Kong in 2001 and an office in mainland China in 2011, allowing Cambridge Audio to have its own production and QC engineers on site. Sales offices and teams were established in Hamburg, Germany and Hong Kong in 2015, followed by an office in Chicago, USA in 2017.

Investment in new products continues and the company now employs more than 100 people including an in-house engineering team, based at the Cambridge Audio HQ in London, SE1.

The 2020 to 2021 annual turnover of Audio Partnership was in excess of £33 million.

References

Electronics companies established in 1968
Audio equipment manufacturers of the United Kingdom
British brands
1968 establishments in England